The aquatic reserve of Estuaire-de-la-Rivière-Bonaventure (in French: Réserve aquatique de l'Estuaire-de-la-Rivière-Bonaventure) is an aquatic reserve of Quebec, in Canada, located near the town of Bonaventure in the Gaspé Peninsula. We find on the islands of the estuary several rare species in Quebec including the Macoun's gentian (Gentianopsis virgata subsp. Macounii), the aster of Anticosti and Richardson's muhlenbergie as well as twenty-seven other rare plant species in the Gaspé.

The reserve, born from the donation of a forestry company to the government of Quebec in 2001, was partially protected during the creation, in 2005, of the floral habitat of Barachois-de-Bonaventure, intended to safeguard the vegetation of the islands. The protected area, definitively created in 2009, is administered by the Ministry of Sustainable Development, Environment, and Fight Against Climate Change.

Geography 

It includes the Îles des Prés, des Sapins, des Chardons and Arseneault as well as the sandy spit of Île aux Pirates. It is entirely located on the territory of the town of Bonaventure in the Bonaventure Regional County Municipality of the administrative region of Gaspésie–Îles-de-la-Madeleine.

Geology and relief 
The reserve is located in the Appalachian Mountains, more precisely on the bedrock of the Bonaventure formation; it is a formation composed of conglomerate, sandstone and mudstone red which dates from Mississippian (between 358 and 323 million years ago). The islands' deposits are composed of sand, gravel and silt with a small proportion of clay of marine origin. The shape of the islands evolves under the action of erosion and sedimentation linked to floods and ice.

Its relief is that of a River delta, at an altitude not exceeding ten meters.

Hydrography 

He is one of ten barachois estuaries in Québec.

Climate 
Its climate, that of the coastal plain of Baie des Chaleurs, is characteristic of an average temperate zone, cool and rainy with harsh winters. However, the bay's maritime influence mitigates the extreme temperatures; winters are therefore milder than in Quebec, for example. It is the region with the least snowfall in eastern Quebec. The prevailing winds, in winter as in summer, blow from the west.

<! - START OF TABLE ->

<! - END OF TABLE ->

Natural environment 
The name and delimitation of ecoregions differ according to the organizations that establish them. According to the Commission for Environmental Cooperation, the reserve is located in the Maritime Lowlands Eastern Temperate Forests. The Canadian ecological framework. Listed in the ecozone of the northern highlands of New Brunswick while the World Wildlife Fund locates it in the New England–Acadian forests ecoregion.

The northern highlands ecozone of New Brunswick includes in its upland areas forests of sugar maple, bigleaf beech and yellow birch. The valleys are dominated by eastern hemlock, balsam fir, white pine and white spruce. In the drier north of the ecoregion, grow white pine, red pine, jack pine, spruce and fir.

Delta 

The channels of the river are colonized by the Enteromorpha intestinalis, a plant very resistant to changes in salinity. The islands contain wooded swamps populated by black spruce, American elm, balsam poplar with unwooded portions colonized by herbaceous plants and shrubs. The broadleaf cattail is the dominant plant in freshwater marshes. The wet grasslands are populated by Canadian calamagrostid, red knot bulrush, Canadian sanguisorb, and ground lysimachus. The shrub swamps are composed of rough alder (Alnus incana subsp. Rugosa), Bebb's willow, woolly-headed willow, all accompanied by myric balsam and sanguisorb from Canada. The driest stations are occupied by white spruce and western cedar.

The islands provide habitat for three rare species in Quebec. The first is Macoun's gentian (Gentianopsis virgata subsp. Macounii). It is an annual herbaceous plant that grows on the shores of fresh or brackish water estuaries. This plant is found in Quebec on the coast of James Bay and in Bonaventure. This is the only occurrence of this plant in Gaspésie. We also find Anticosti aster, a herbaceous plant endemic to the Gulf of St. Lawrence and Richardson's muhlenbergie, a riverine plant and limestone plateaus which is only present in about fifteen places in Quebec. There are also twenty-seven other regionally rare species such as Gmelin's buttercup and the marsh aster (Symphyotrichum novi-belgii var. Elodes).

The river is the most important rainbow smelt spawning ground in Gaspésie.

The channel between Arsenault and Des Prés islands is appreciated by bird x in migration period. The most commonly observed migratory bird species are the Canada goose, black duck, mallard and green-winged teal.

Lagoon 

Eelgrass is the dominant plant in barachois, often accompanied by "Enteromorpha intestinalis". The flora of the lagoon also includes sea lettuce, ruppie maritime and swamp zannichellie. The lagoon is bordered, in places, by salt or brackish marshes. The dominant plants in the marshes are Baltic rush, scaly sedge, red fescue, spartina spartina, l'New York aster and the éléocharide uniglume.

The plankton of the lagoon is composed of copepods and nauplius of crustaceans. The lagoon is also occupied by about fifteen species of fish including stickleback, capucette, dead shock, bronzed sculpin, smooth plaice, winter flounder, American eel, rainbow smelt, Atlantic herring and Atlantic tomcod. The mudflats are visited by several species of birds shorebirds and palmipeds. The species at risk in Quebec or Canada are the yellow rail and the red-headed woodpecker. The rare species at the regional level are the American coot, the pygmy gull, the black-headed gull and Great Egret.

Coastline 
On the eastern spit, the most common plants are Short-ligule Ammophila, American Sand Elyme, sea grass pea, toadflax, Berlandier's goosefoot, toothless caquillier and sabline false peplus. The western spit, which is not part of the reserve, is strongly disturbed and its vegetation is similar to that of the anthropogenic environments. The upper part of the beach is dominated by spartina alterniflora accompanied by Canadian spergulaire, glasswort, maritime plantain and maritime suaeda. As for the slikke, it is dominated by eelgrass. The cordon fauna receives a large number of birds, in particular anatidae and shorebirds.

Coastline 
The vegetation of stony bottoms is composed of algae, the main species of which are bifid wrack, bladder wrack, Irish moss, riddled kelp, knotty ascophyllum and palmate hand-sea.

The coastal waters of Bonaventure are home to many species of invertebrates, including blue mussel, common clam, sea scallop, scallop Iceland, green sea urchin, common littorine, common starfish, snow crab and American lobster. The seagrass beds provide refuge for rock crab, gray sand shrimp and marine worms. Among the 30 species of fish recorded are the Atlantic tomcod and American eel. The coastline is an important staging area for water and shorebirds. The Barrow's Goldeneye, considered to be a species threatened, has been observed there in Canada. A few marine mammals visit the site, including minke whale, fin whale, harbor seal, gray seal and harbor porpoise.

History 

The first developments of the estuary were carried out from the end of the 19th century and during the 1960s, with the construction of the timber flotation channel feeding a sawmill. Subsequently, the construction of the causeway of the route 132, port facilities and a marina, greatly disrupted traffic. water as well ase the lagoon sedimentation processes. To remedy this, the causeway was pierced with a culvert and the pier, connecting route 132 to the Pointe de Beaubassin, was dismantled.

The origin of the reserve comes from an ecological gift from the company "Emballages Smurfit-Stone (Canada) inc." To the government of Quebec, in 2001. In 2005, the all of the estuary islands were included in the Barachois-de-Bonaventure plant habitat. On 7 September of the same year, the territory of the reserve obtained the status of “proposed aquatic reserve”. The ministry entrusted to the Office of public hearings on the environment (BAPE), in July 2006, the mandate to carry out public consultations, in order to give a permanent status to the aquatic reserve and the Karst-de-Saint-Elzéar Biodiversity Reserve. Sessions were held in September and October of the same year and the report was published in February 2007. The BAPE recommended removing two portions of the initial project: the beach on the sand spit of Beaubassin, because of its intensive use, and the basin between the Bonaventure marina and the route 132, because of the dredging works which maintain navigation towards the fishing port and the marina. These two withdrawals were accepted by the ministry and excluded from the reserve, which obtained its permanent status on 15 April 2009.

Activity 

The reserve, administered by the Ministry of Sustainable Development, Environment, and Fight Against Climate Change., has no infrastructure. Access to Île aux Pirates, via the Cap-de-Sable road, is one kilometer southeast of the Vieux-Ponts road on route 132. Boats can also dock there. A hiking trail crosses the reserve at the level of the old route 6. A tourist stop located at the Acadian Museum of Quebec offers a point of view on the barachois. Unlike National Parks of Quebec, hunting and fishing are tolerated but, since 2012, the installation of ice fishing huts has been subject to authorization due to the incidents observed in 2011.

See also 

 Zec de la Rivière-Bonaventure
 Protected areas of Quebec

Bibliography

References 
 Government of Quebec 2009 - conservation plan: in bibliography and in PDF:

 Other references:

Protected areas of Gaspésie–Îles-de-la-Madeleine